Perny's long-nosed squirrel (Dremomys pernyi) is a species of rodent in the family Sciuridae. It is found in Northeast India, southern and central China, northern Myanmar, northern Vietnam, and Taiwan.

References

Thorington, R.W. Jr. and R.S. Hoffman. (2005). Family Sciuridae. pp. 754–818 In Mammal Species of the World a Taxonomic and Geographic Reference. D.E. Wilson and D.M. Reeder eds. Johns Hopkins University Press, Baltimore.

Dremomys
Rodents of China
Rodents of India
Rodents of Myanmar
Mammals of Taiwan
Rodents of Vietnam
Mammals described in 1867
Taxa named by Henri Milne-Edwards
Taxonomy articles created by Polbot